Mainzodden is a headland in Oscar II Land at Spitsbergen, Svalbard. It is located in Ny-Ålesund at the southwestern side of Kongsfjorden, and marks the northern extension of the bay Zeppelinhamna.

References

Ny-Ålesund
Headlands of Spitsbergen